The men's discus throw was a track and field athletics event held as part of the athletics at the 1912 Summer Olympics programme. The competition was held on Friday, July 12, 1912. Forty-one discus throwers from 15 nation competed. NOCs could enter up to 12 athletes. The event was won by Armas Taipale of Finland, the nation's first medal in the men's discus throw. Richard Byrd took silver and James Duncan took bronze to continue the United States' podium streak at five consecutive Games.

Background

This was the fifth appearance of the event, which is one of 12 athletics events to have been held at every Summer Olympics. Returning competitors from 1908 included fourth-place finisher Verner Järvinen of Finland, seventh-place finisher György Luntzer of Hungary, eighth-place finisher André Tison of France, and eleventh-place finisher Emil Welz of Germany. Multiple gold medalist Martin Sheridan of the United States had retired in 1911, leaving the competition "wide-open."

Canada, Luxembourg, Russia, and Turkey each made their debut in the men's discus throw. Greece and the United States each made their fifth appearance, having competed in every edition of the Olympic men's discus throw to date.

Competition format

The competition continued to use the single, divided-final format in use since 1896. Each athlete received three throws, with the top three receiving an additional three throws. Ties were broken by an additional throw. The landing area was a 90 degree sector.

Records

These were the standing world and Olympic records (in metres) prior to the 1912 Summer Olympics.

Armas Taipale ended the competition with the new Olympic record at 45.21 metres, with seven men bettering the old record.

Schedule

Results

No fewer than seven throwers beat the old Olympic record of 40.89 metres, beginning with Duncan and Niklander's first throws. Niklander's was the best of the round. The second throw resulted in Mucks joining those who beat the old record, while Taipale, Byrd, and Duncan beat even the new one, with Taipale's 43.91 metres setting a mark no other thrower would reach. Philbrook and Tronner beat the old record in the third throw, but neither was able to break into the top three. Niklander, after his first throw, was unable to make another legal mark and fell to fourth, where he finished.

In the final, Byrd and Duncan were unable to improve upon their previous marks, throwing shorter in their first throws and scratching in their second and third throws each. Taipale, on the other hand, regardless of the safety of his lead, threw even further in his first and then his third throw, finishing at 45.21 metres, nearly 3 metres ahead of Byrd.

There were 32 non-starters.

References

Sources
 
 

Athletics at the 1912 Summer Olympics
Discus throw at the Olympics